Ye Liansong (born March 1935) is a Chinese politician who served as Communist Party Secretary (1998–2000) and Governor (1993–1998) of Hebei Province. Prior to his political career he worked for two decades as an engineering professor at his alma mater Shanghai Jiao Tong University, and then as chief engineer of Shijiazhuang Diesel Engine Factory.

Biography
Ye was born in Laiyang, Shandong Province in March 1935. He attended Dalian Institute of Technology (now Dalian University of Technology) from 1954 to 1955, before transferring to Shanghai Jiao Tong University. After graduating in August 1960 with a degree in marine engineering, he stayed at the university as a faculty member until 1973. He joined the Communist Party of China in 1960.

In March 1973, he was transferred to Shijiazhuang Diesel Engine Factory to serve as its chief engineer and deputy head. In October 1980, he was appointed vice mayor of Shijiazhuang, the capital of Hebei Province. During an interview, Ye said he had never thought of becoming a politician, and had no idea that he was to become vice mayor until Jia Ran, party chief of Shijiazhuang, told him the government's decision.

He was promoted to vice governor of Hebei in June 1985, and became a member of the Provincial Party Standing Committee. He became Governor of Hebei in May 1993, and was promoted to Communist Party Secretary, the top post in the province, in September 1998. He served as party chief until March 2000, when he became a standing committee member of the Chinese People's Political Consultative Conference (CPPCC). Starting in 2003, he served as Vice-Chairman of the Economy Committee of the CPPCC.

Ye was an alternate member to the 13th Central Committee of the Communist Party of China (1987–1992) and a full member of the 14th (1992–1997) and 15th (1997–2002) Central Committees. He was a delegate to the 8th (1993–1998) and 9th National People's Congress (1998–2003).

References

1935 births
People's Republic of China politicians from Shandong
Chinese Communist Party politicians from Shandong
Governors of Hebei
Alternate members of the 13th Central Committee of the Chinese Communist Party
Members of the 14th Central Committee of the Chinese Communist Party
Members of the 15th Central Committee of the Chinese Communist Party
Delegates to the 8th National People's Congress
Delegates to the 9th National People's Congress
Members of the 9th Chinese People's Political Consultative Conference
Members of the 10th Chinese People's Political Consultative Conference
Shanghai Jiao Tong University alumni
Academic staff of Shanghai Jiao Tong University
Marine engineers
Engineers from Shandong
Dalian University of Technology alumni
Living people
Politicians from Yantai
Educators from Shandong